Penicillium ovatum is a species of fungus in the genus Penicillium which was isolated from forest soil in Kuala Lumpur in Malaysia.

References

ovatum
Fungi described in 2011